Alma Wilford Richards (February 20, 1890 – April 3, 1963) was an American athlete. He was the first resident of Utah to win a gold medal at the Olympic Games, in 1912, in the running high jump event.

Jumping
Born in Parowan, Utah, Alma Richards was an eighth grade farm boy who decided to stop school and explore the world. 

At Brigham Young University in Provo, Utah, BYU coach Eugene L. Roberts saw Richards playing basketball, and instructed him to jump over a six-foot-high bar. He did so easily. The coach then proceeded to raise money to get Richards to the 1912 Trials in the High Jump. Richards proceeded to defeat American champion George Horine in the final and win the gold medal at the Stockholm Olympics in 1912.

Richards graduated from Brigham Young prep school in 1913, and then attended Cornell University with a scholarship, where he was also a member of the Quill and Dagger society. The Olympics did wonders for his self-confidence, and whereas he was once just a marginal student, his aptitude and attitude now were boundless. He thrived at Cornell, in the classroom and on the track. He was the national AAU high jump champion in 1913 and later, as he expanded his repertoire, he became a decathlete as well.

By the time of the national AAU championships of 1915, held in conjunction with the World's Fair in San Francisco, he became the national decathlon champion, finishing some 400 points ahead of Avery Brundage, who would later head the International Olympic Committee.

Richards was the United States' best decathlete and high jumper due to enter the 1916 Olympic Games, but those Games were never held, because of the outbreak of World War I.

Later years
After graduating with honors from Cornell University in 1917, Alma attended graduate school at Stanford University, before enrolling in law school at the University of Southern California. He got his law degree, and passed the bar, but chose not to practice law and instead chose teaching. He became a science teacher in Los Angeles at Venice High School, where he remained for 32 years until he retired. Richards was buried, according to his wishes, in the Parowan Cemetery. He was posthumously inducted into the Utah Sports Hall of Fame (1970), Helms Hall of Fame and Brigham Young University Hall of Fame.

Personal life
Alma’s first wife was Marian Gardiner Richards. They had one child, Joanna Richards. His second wife was Gertrude Huntimer Richards, and they had three children: Mary Richards Schraeger of La Habra Heights, California;  Anita Richards Ricciardi of Whittier California; and Paul Richards of Los Angeles, California.

Legacy
The Parowan High School's track and football stadium is named the Alma Richards Stadium.

References

External links

Photograph of Alma Richards in a triumphal parade after his return from the 1912 Olympics in Stockholm, UA P 2 Series 2 Item 1100 box 7 folder 70–89 at L. Tom Perry Special Collections, Brigham Young University

1890 births
1963 deaths
American Latter Day Saints
Schoolteachers from California
20th-century American women educators
Athletes (track and field) at the 1912 Summer Olympics
Cornell University alumni
Stanford University alumni
BYU Cougars men's track and field athletes
USC Gould School of Law alumni
American male high jumpers
Olympic gold medalists for the United States in track and field
People from Parowan, Utah
Track and field athletes from Utah
Medalists at the 1912 Summer Olympics
20th-century American educators
Brigham Young High School alumni